Glenn Benjamin (born April 4, 1972) is a retired Trinidad and Tobago association football player who was a member of the Trinidad and Tobago U-20 national team at the 1991 FIFA World Youth Championship.

Club
Benjamin graduated from Saint Benedict's College, a secondary school in Trinidad.  He attended the University of Mobile, playing on the men’s soccer team from 1993 to 1996.  In 1994, Benjamin and his teammates finished runner-up in the final of the NAIA national men's soccer championship.  In 1996, he was selected as an NAIA All American.  In April 1997, Benjamin signed with the New Orleans Riverboat Gamblers of the USISL A-League.  In early 2000, Benjamin joined the Tennessee Rhythm, but was released  in May.  In February 2001, the Charleston Battery signed Benjamin, but he played only one game before being released.  In 2002, he briefly played for the Hampton Roads Mariners.  He finished his career with the New Orleans Shell Shockers of the USL Premier Development League.

International
Benjamin played for the Trinidad and Tobago national teams at both the youth and senior levels.  He was a member of the Trinidad and Tobago U-20 national team at the 1991 FIFA World Youth Championship.

References

External links
 

Living people
1972 births
Charleston Battery players
Virginia Beach Mariners players
New Orleans Shell Shockers players
New Orleans Riverboat Gamblers players
Trinidad and Tobago footballers
Trinidad and Tobago expatriate footballers
Trinidad and Tobago international footballers
Expatriate soccer players in the United States
Trinidad and Tobago expatriate sportspeople in the United States
A-League (1995–2004) players
USL League Two players
Rivoli United F.C. players
Association football midfielders
Association football forwards